The oxysterol-binding protein (OSBP)-related proteins (ORPs) are a family of lipid transfer proteins (LTPs). Concretely, they constitute a family of sterol and phosphoinositide binding and transfer proteins in eukaryotes that are conserved from yeast to humans. They are lipid-binding proteins implicated in many cellular processes related with oxysterol, including signaling, vesicular trafficking, lipid metabolism, and nonvesicular sterol transport.

In yeast cells, some ORPs might function as sterol or lipid transporters though yeast strains lacking ORPs do not have significant defects in sterol transport between the endoplasmic reticulum and the plasma membrane. Although sterol transfer is proposed to occur at regions where organelle membranes are closely apposed, disruption of endoplasmic reticulum-plasma membrane contact sites do not have major effects on sterol transfer, though phospholipid homeostasis is perturbed. Various ORPs confine at membrane contacts sites (MCS), where endoplasmic reticulum (ER) is apposed with other organelle limiting membranes. Yeast ORPs also participate in vesicular trafficking, in which they affect Sec14-dependent Golgi vesicle biogenesis and, later in post-Golgi exocytosis, they affect exocyst complex-dependent vesicle tethering to the plasma membrane. 
In mammalian cells, some ORPs function as sterol sensors that regulate the assembly of protein complexes in response to changes in cholesterol levels. By that means, ORPs most likely affect organelle membrane lipid compositions, with impacts on signaling and vesicle transport, but also cellular lipid metabolism.

Oxysterol is a cholesterol metabolite that can be produced through enzymatic or radical processes. Oxysterols, that are the 27-carbon products of cholesterol oxidation by both enzymic and non-enzymic mechanisms, constitute a large family of lipids involved in a plethora of physiological processes. Studies identifying the specific cellular targets of oxysterol indicate that several oxysterols may be regulators of cellular lipid metabolism via control of gene transcription. In addition, they were shown to be involved in other processes such as immune regulatory functions and brain homeostasis.

Structure 

All oxysterol related proteins (ORP) contain a core lipid-binding domain (ORD), which has a characteristic amino acids sequence, EQVSHHPP. The most studied ORP are human and yeast ones, and the only OSBP-ORP whose structure is completely known is the Kes1p, also called Osh4p, a yeast one. Six different protein domains and structural motifs types are found in OSBP-ORPs.

FFAT motif

This is two phenylalanines in an acidic tract. It is bound by the endoplasmic reticulum to a lot of proteins involved in lipid metabolism. It is contained in most mammalian ORPs and in about 40% of yeast's ORPs.

Ankyrin motif

It is thought that it takes part in protein-protein interactions, but it is not known for certain. In some proteins, it also contributes to the localization of each protein to a membrane contact site (zone of close contact between the endoplasmic reticulum and a second organelle).

Transmembrane domain

It is only present in some human proteins. It is a hydrophobic region which holds the protein to the cell membrane.

PH (pleckstrin homology) domain

It binds phosphoinositides, usually only the ones which have low affinity and other ligands. It also recognizes organelles enriched in the PIPs.

GOLD (Golgi dynamics) domain

As well as Ankyrin motif, it probably mediates interactions between proteins. It is only found in one yeast protein and it is not found in any human ORP.

ORD (OSBP-related domain)

It contains the EQVSHHPP sequence. It has an hydrophobic pocket that binds a sterol and also contains multiple membrane binding surfaces which permit the protein to have the ability to cause liposome aggregation.

Main functions

As part of the Lipid Transfer proteins (LTPs) family, ORPs have different and variate functions. This functions include signaling, vesicular trafficking, lipid metabolism and nonvesicular sterol transport. ORPs have been studied in many organisms cells as human cells or yeast. 
In yeast, where organelle membranes are closely apposed it has been proposed that ORPs work as sterol transporters, though only a few ORPs actually bind sterols and collectively yeast ORPs are dispensable for sterol transfer in vivo. They are also part of Golgi-to-plasma membrane vesicular trafficking, but their role is not clear yet.
In mammalian, ORPs participate as sterol sensors. This sensors regulate the assembly of protein complexes when cholesterol levels fluctuate.

 

They use the following mechanisms:

1-They could extract and deliver lipids from one membrane to another. Probably at membrane contact site.

2-ORPs help establish the membrane when transient changes in the distribution of lipids occur. They add or remove lipids within different regions of the membrane. The exclusion of certain lipids in particular regions drive to processes such as membrane binding or signaling.

3-They work as lipid sensors altering interactions with other proteins due to binding or releasing lipid ligands. It occurs mainly at inally organelle contact sites.

4-The access of other lipid-binding proteins to the membrane is regulated by ORPs in two ways. One way is by presenting a lipid to a second lipid-binding protein. (5)Another way is preventing the lipid-binding protein from accessing a lipid in the membrane. This two mechanisms are not mutually exclusive so ORPs might use both.

OSBP-ORPs human proteins
In humans there are 12 ORP genes, and splicing generates 16 different protein products.

OSBP-ORPs yeast proteins
In yeast (Saccharomyces cerevisiæ) we can find 7 ORP genes called OSH1-7, but they have some additional names as well.

Role in disease
Some oxysterols have been found to contribute to the inflammation and oxidative damage as well as in cell death in the appearance and especially the development of some of the most important chronic diseases, such as atherosclerosis, neurodegenerative diseases, inflammatory bowel diseases, age-related macular degeneration and other pathological conditions related to cholesterol absorption.

Besides, a recent study suggests a method of screening and diagnosing Niemann-Pick C disease by plasma oxysterol screening, which is found to be less invasive, more sensitive and specific and more economical strategy than the current practice.

References 

Protein domains
Peripheral membrane proteins